Kimberley Gail Ratcliff (née Marsh, previously Ryder and Lomas; born 13 June 1976) is an English actress, television presenter and singer. In 2001, she won a place in the band Hear'Say as a result of appearing on the reality television series Popstars. Hear'Say enjoyed brief success, achieving two UK number one singles and a UK number one album, but Marsh left the band in 2002 to pursue a solo career. She released an album titled Standing Tall in 2003, which peaked at number nine in the UK and spawned two UK top ten singles.

From 2006 to 2019, she portrayed Michelle Connor on the ITV soap opera Coronation Street. She won the British Soap Award for Best Newcomer at the 2007 British Soap Awards, as well as winning the Newcomer category at the 2007 National Television Awards and being nominated for Best Female Dramatic Performance at the 2017 British Soap Awards. In 2010, she finished in fourth place on Popstar to Operastar, a reality show featuring well-known pop stars being trained to sing opera. Since October 2020, Marsh has co-fronted the BBC One morning lifestyle programme Morning Live alongside Welsh presenter Gethin Jones. From 2022, Marsh appeared in the revival of the BBC school drama series Waterloo Road.

Early life 
Marsh was born on 13 June 1976 in Whiston Hospital in Whiston, Merseyside to Pauline and David Marsh, who lived in Garswood, Ashton in Makerfield, Metropolitan Borough of Wigan. She has two older brothers and one older sister. Her father was a joiner and in his spare time was the lead guitarist for the band Ricky and the Dominant Four who were a supporting act to The Beatles at The Cavern Club. She attended Byrchall High School in Ashton-in-Makerfield and the Elliot Clarke Stage School in Liverpool for two years, leaving when she was 15.

Music career

Early singing career and Hear'Say

Marsh provided session vocals for artists including Matt Darey, the group Freaky Realistic and the duo Hemstock & Jennings. She sang in Norwegian on the latter's track "Arctic", which caught the attention of Paul van Dyk, and was remixed and re-recorded with additional vocals from Jan Johnston. The track, renamed "Nothing But You", was released in the UK via Positiva and reached number 14 in the UK charts.

In late 2000, Marsh auditioned for the ITV talent show Popstars. She was one of the five singers chosen for the newly formed band Hear'Say, along with Danny Foster, Myleene Klass, Suzanne Shaw and Noel Sullivan. In March 2001, Hear'Say released their first single "Pure and Simple", a cover of a track by Girl Thing. She was hailed by her girl bandmates as 'the funniest out of the bunch’. The song went straight to number 1 on the UK Singles Chart in March 2001, selling just under 550,000 copies. The group then released their second single, "The Way to Your Love," in June 2001. The song became their second consecutive number 1 single. Shortly afterwards the group toured the UK. In January 2002, Marsh announced that she was leaving Hear'Say. Auditions were held to find a replacement for her, but the group split up in October 2002.

Solo career
After a while out of the spotlight Marsh signed a solo record deal with Island Records. Her first single, "Cry", went to number 2 in the UK Singles Chart and her second single, "Come on Over," made it to number 10. In July 2003, Marsh released her debut solo album, Standing Tall, which peaked at number 9 in the UK. It contained three solo singles and twelve other tracks. However, her make-or-break third single, "Sentimental", stalled at number 35, and that resulted in her being dropped by her record label. In early 2006, Marsh entered Making Your Mind Up with a song titled "Whisper to Me", a show intended to pick a singer and a song for the UK entry in the Eurovision Song Contest. Marsh came fourth in the contest, which was won by Daz Sampson.

Television career

Marsh made her television acting debut in 2005, in an episode of the BBC One soap opera Doctors, playing a character called Ruth Parry. That same year, she also became a regular panellist on ITV's daytime show Loose Women for its eighth series. In 2006, she played sex worker Kay Price in the first 2 episodes of Channel 4's soap opera Hollyoaks: In the City.

Marsh joined the cast of Coronation Street, playing Michelle Connor from April 2006 a role she held until 2019. For her role on the show she has subsequently received Newcomer awards at the 2007 British Soap Awards and the 2007 National Television Awards, among others. Becoming a regular character, her storylines have included a serious relationship with Steve McDonald (Simon Gregson), discovering that her son had been swapped at birth, the death of her eldest brother Paul (Sean Gallagher) and the murder of her other brother Liam (Rob James-Collier), her failed engagement to Ciaran McCarthy (Keith Duffy), surviving a minibus crash, becoming pregnant with Steve's baby, learning that Steve has also impregnated Leanne Battersby (Jane Danson), delivering a stillborn son Ruairi and being stalked by her ex-boyfriend Will (Leon Ockenden). Other storylines have focused on the relationships with her sisters-in-law, Carla (Alison King) and Maria (Samia Ghadie), as well as her relationship with Robert Preston (Tristan Gemmill) after the collapse of her marriage to Steve.

In 2008, as the character dominated more storylines, some fans began to tire of her as well as her behaviour. The baby-swap storyline, which Michelle was central to, was largely panned by both fans and critics, columnist Grace Dent said of the plot; "...It feels like something ripped from a copy of Pick Me Up magazine and read to me laboriously over 22 weeks". In contrast, the 2017 stillbirth storyline as well as Marsh's performance received rave reviews and were praised by the stillbirth charity Sands. Marsh, whose real-life son Archie was also stillborn, explained that it was important for her to take on the storyline in order to raise awareness of the issue. She also voiced for the change in law which would see stillborn children receive birth certificates. The actress also stated it was "the best way to honour" her son. She later won the 2017 British Soap Award for Best Female Dramatic Performance. On 24 February 2019, it was announced that Marsh would be leaving the soap after 13 years and Michelle's final scenes were broadcast on 27 December 2019.

Marsh began presenting the daily morning magazine show Morning Live on BBC One on 26 October 2020, alongside Gethin Jones. The series ended on 18 December 2020 and the BBC confirmed on 17 December it would return in 2021 for a second series. In March 2021, Marsh appeared in the fourth series of the BBC One drama The Syndicate as Donna. 

In February 2022, she was announced as one of the starring cast members of BBC's revival of their school drama Waterloo Road, which began airing in January 2023.

On 4 August 2022, it was announced that Marsh would be competing on the twentieth series of Strictly Come Dancing. She was partnered with Graziano Di Prima. The series launched on 24 September 2022. On 22 November 2022, it was announced that Marsh had tested positive for COVID and would, therefore, have to miss that Saturday's appearance on the show. She was the tenth celebrity to be eliminated, on 3 December 2022, after losing the dance off to Molly Rainford and Carlos Gu.

Personal life

Marsh has been married three times and has four children and two grandsons. She has a son named David (born 1995) and a daughter named Emilie (born 1997) from a relationship with Dave Cunliffe. She married the actor Jack Ryder in St Albans, Hertfordshire, on 10 August 2002. It was announced on 20 March 2008 that the couple had decided to separate and would be seeking a divorce and they announced their divorce on 12 August 2009.

Marsh dated actor Jamie Lomas from July 2008 onwards. They married in Cheshire in September 2012. She and Lomas announced that they were expecting a baby in 2009. Their son, Archie, was born 18 weeks early on 11 February and died moments after birth. On 23 March 2011, their daughter Polly was born. On 3 October 2012, Marsh announced that she would be taking Lomas' name professionally. They separated in 2013 and divorced in 2014.

In May 2017, a wax figure of Marsh's Coronation Street character was added to the gallery of Madame Tussauds Blackpool.

In May 2019, Marsh became a grandmother when her daughter Emilie had a son. Marsh announced her engagement to Scott Ratcliff, an army major, on 14 June 2021 and they married on 16 October 2021. 

Marsh became a grandmother for the second time in August 2022, when her son David and his fiancée Courtney had a son named Clayton.

Filmography

Film

Television

Discography

Studio albums

Extended plays

Singles

Awards and nominations

Other

References

External links

 
 Morning Live (BBC One)

 
1976 births
Living people
People from Whiston, Merseyside
English soap opera actresses
English stage actresses
English television actresses
English television presenters
Popstar to Operastar contestants
Marsh, Kym